The First Baptist Society of Bath, also known as Bath Baptist Church, is a historic Baptist church located at Bath, Steuben County, New York. The church was built in 1887–1888, and is a cruciform plan, Romanesque Revival style brick and stone church.  It has a steep cross-gable roof and square corner bell tower with a tall octagonal spire.  The church features rounded windows and lintels.  Attached to the church is a fellowship hall built in 1952 and expanded in 1981.

It was listed on the National Register of Historic Places in 2013.

References

External links
Bath Baptist Church website

Baptist churches in New York (state)
Churches on the National Register of Historic Places in New York (state)
Romanesque Revival architecture in New York (state)
Religious buildings and structures completed in 1888
20th-century Baptist churches in the United States
Churches in Steuben County, New York
National Register of Historic Places in Steuben County, New York